John Daniel Wild (April 10, 1902 – October 23, 1972) was a twentieth-century American philosopher.  Wild began his philosophical career as an empiricist and realist but became an important proponent of existentialism and phenomenology in the United States.

Life and career
Wild was born in Chicago, Illinois. After undergraduate studies at the University of Chicago, he received his master's degree from Harvard University and completed his PhD at the University of Chicago in 1926.

He taught for a year at the University of Michigan and then at Harvard from 1927 until 1961 when he left to assume the chairmanship of the philosophy department at Northwestern University, a leading center for phenomenology and existentialism in the United States.  Wild moved to Yale in 1963 and, in 1969, to the University of Florida.

He received an honorary doctorate from Ripon College and served as visiting professor at the Universities of Chicago, Hawaii, and Washington.  He served as president of the Association for Realistic Philosophy (1949) and the Metaphysical Society of America (1954).  In 1962 Wild, along with  William A. Earle, James M. Edie, and others, founded the Society for Phenomenology and Existential Philosophy.

John Wild died in New Haven, Connecticut.

Major works

Books
  552 pages.

  320 pages.

  516 pages.
  (paper).

  259 pages.

  297 pages.
 .

  250 pages.

   186 pages.

  243 pages.

  430 pages.
 .

Books edited
  479 pages.

  117 pages.

  373 pages.

See also
 American philosophy
 List of American philosophers

Notes

Further reading
  414 pages.

  226 pages. .

  289 pages. .

External links 

 John Daniel Wild Papers. General Collection, Beinecke Rare Book and Manuscript Library, Yale University.

1902 births
1972 deaths
20th-century American philosophers
American philosophy academics
Existentialists
University of Chicago alumni
Harvard University alumni
Northwestern University faculty
People from Chicago
Phenomenologists
Yale University faculty
University of Florida faculty
University of Michigan faculty
Presidents of the Metaphysical Society of America